In 2022, Mongolia has suffered a historic number of wildfires. By August, it was reported that over one million hectares of land has been burned. The number of wildfires is 73% higher than the 2021 period.

References

See also 

2022 wildfires
2022 meteorology
2022 fires in Asia
2022 natural disasters
2022 in Mongolia
2022 disasters in Mongolia